Phì Nhừ is a commune (xã) and village of the Điện Biên Đông District of Điện Biên Province, northwestern Vietnam.

References

External links
www.tin247.com 

Communes of Điện Biên province
Populated places in Điện Biên province